Paul Meany (born July 2, 1976) is an American singer-songwriter, multi-instrumentalist, music director and record producer. He is best known as the lead singer and keyboardist for the alternative rock band Mutemath.

Career

While under the moniker "Math" (the precursor to Mutemath), Paul Meany remixed the song "J Train" from TobyMac's debut studio album Momentum. The remix appeared as the first track on the album Re:Mix Momentum by TobyMac, and included vocals from Meany.

Meany has continued to work on many various projects outside of Mutemath, producing tracks for Forenn and KiND, as well as the debut EP of bandmate Jonathan Allen. Meany was the featured vocalist on Steve Angello single "Breaking Kind" released on August 4, 2017 as well as Seven Lions and Jason Ross' single "Higher Love" released on January 13, 2017.

After Mutemath and Warner Bros. Records parted ways in 2015 and the dissolution of the Teleprompt partnership, Meany launched his own independent label Wojtek Records based in New York. Mutemath's fourth & fifth full length albums and remix project were all released via Wojtek in partnership with Caroline Records.

He was one of the co-founders of the independent label Teleprompt Records that has since been dissolved. Prior to forming Mutemath with drummer Darren King, Meany was the keyboardist and backing vocalist for the band Earthsuit and provided the same for the beginning stages of another Adam LaClave-fronted band, Macrosick. Meany has also co-produced tracks for Jeremy Larson and another Earthsuit spin-off, Club of the Sons.

In 2003, Meany collaborated on an LP entitled, "Elevator Music," released by Victory Fellowship Church prior to Hurricane Katrina, and was later used as a fund-raising initiative to support victims. The album, comprising fifteen contemporary worship tracks, was recorded live at Victory Fellowship Church, with Meany providing lead vocals.

Meany assisted in producing much of the fifth Twenty One Pilots studio album, Trench, which was released on October 5, 2018. He also contributed to the one-off single "Level of Concern" in 2020, which was recorded and released during the beginning of the COVID-19 pandemic in the United States. Meany previously worked with them alongside his former bandmates to "reimagine" and produce the TOPxMM EP that was released on December 19, 2016, which included four remakes off of their Blurryface album, and the single "Heathens", as well as a live 20-minute video of the bands performing it together in the studio. He assisted in the production of the duo's sixth studio album, Scaled and Icy; is a part of the band's live ensemble, and also acts as a musical director for them.

Meany also produced "Creature", the closing track off of Half Alive's debut album, Now, Not Yet, which released on August 9, 2019. In 2020 and 2021, Paul Meany worked with The Blue Stones, producing their second album "Hidden Gems," which was released on March 19, 2021.

Meany is also currently recording post-hardcore band Pierce the Veil's fifth studio album in New Orleans, Louisiana.

Meany announced on social media that he would be releasing a solo album titled "Motivational Speaker" in 2023.

References

1976 births
21st-century American singers
21st-century American male singers
Living people
Brother Martin High School alumni
American performers of Christian music
Musicians from New Orleans
American rock singers
American rock keyboardists
American indie rock musicians
American multi-instrumentalists
Singers from Louisiana